Băbana is a commune in Argeș County, Muntenia, Romania. It is composed of seven villages: Băbana, Băjănești, Ciobănești, Cotmenița, Groși, Lupueni and Slătioarele.

References

Communes in Argeș County
Localities in Muntenia